Ranken is a name of Scottish and Irish origin. The name is cognate with the surname Rankin which is derived from the medieval personal name Rankin, a diminutive of Ronald or Rand, combined with the diminutive suffix kin. It may refer to:

Andrew Ranken (born 1953), English drummer, percussionist for the English-Irish band The Pogues
Charles Ranken (1828–1905), Church of England clergyman, minor British chess master
Harry Sherwood Ranken VC (1883–1914), Scottish recipient of the Victoria Cross
Mary Cohan Ranken or Mary Cohan (1909–1983), Broadway composer and lyricist, daughter of George M. Cohan
Mary Ranken Jordan (1869–1962), prominent American philanthropist, advocate of many charitable organizations
Ted Ranken (1875–1950), British sport shooter, competed in the 1908 Summer Olympics
Thomas Ranken Lyle FRS (1860–1944), Irish-born and educated mathematical physicist and educator
William Bruce Ellis Ranken (1881–1941), English painter

See also
Ranken dart, air-dropped weapon developed during World War I for destroying Zeppelins
Ranken Jordan – A Pediatric Specialty Hospital, in the United States
Ranken Technical College, private college in St. Louis, Missouri
Thomas Ranken Lyle Medal, awarded by the Australian Academy of Science to a mathematician or physicist
Ranker
Rankin (disambiguation)
Rankine (disambiguation)

Footnotes